Paulding Township is one of the twelve townships of Paulding County, Ohio, United States.  The 2000 census found 4,008 people in the township, 1,086 of whom lived in the unincorporated portions of the township.

Geography
Located in the central part of the county, it borders the following townships:
Crane Township - north
Emerald Township - northeast corner
Jackson Township - east
Latty Township - southeast corner
Blue Creek Township - south
Benton Township - southwest corner
Harrison Township - west
Carryall Township - northwest corner

Two villages are located in Paulding Township: most of Paulding, the county seat and largest village of Paulding County, in the northeast; and Latty in the southeast.

It is one of two county townships (the other being Jackson Township) without a border on any other county.

Name and history
It is the only Paulding Township statewide.

Government
The township is governed by a three-member board of trustees, who are elected in November of odd-numbered years to a four-year term beginning on the following January 1. Two are elected in the year after the presidential election and one is elected in the year before it. There is also an elected township fiscal officer, who serves a four-year term beginning on April 1 of the year after the election, which is held in November of the year before the presidential election. Vacancies in the fiscal officership or on the board of trustees are filled by the remaining trustees.

References

External links
County website

Townships in Paulding County, Ohio
Townships in Ohio